M79 or M-79 may refer to:

 M79 (New York City bus), a New York City Bus route in Manhattan
 Messier 79, a globular cluster in the constellation Lepus
 M79 grenade launcher, an American grenade launcher
 M79 rocket launcher, a Yugoslav rocket launcher
 M-79 (Michigan highway), a state highway in Michigan
 Calder Freeway in Victoria, Australia, designated "M79"
 "M79" (song), a song by Vampire Weekend from their self-titled album